Semur-en-Brionnais is a commune in the Saône-et-Loire department in the region of Bourgogne-Franche-Comté in eastern France.

Sights
 The oldest castle in Burgundy, Château Saint Hugues, dating from 9th century.
 The collegiale Saint Hilaire, the village church, dating from the 12th century.
 The chapel of St Martin la Vallée
 The Priory St Hugues, now the Convent of the Sisters of the Order of St. John 
 The Chapter House. Built as a small monastery, this building later housed the village school and now contains, among other things, an exhibition of Romanesque Architecture in the Brionnais
 The village ramparts
 
Semur-en-Brionnais is the birthplace of 
 Saint Hugues, the founder of Cluny Abbey, born 1024
 Henriette d'Angeville, the second woman to climb Mont Blanc. 
 The chef Albert Roux OBE, KFO, born in October 1935.  He owns Le Gavroche, the first restaurant in Britain to win three Michelin Stars.

See also
Communes of the Saône-et-Loire department

References

External links
The village website

Communes of Saône-et-Loire
Plus Beaux Villages de France